Lucas Arnold and Luis Lobo were the defending champions but only Arnold competed that year with Mariano Hood.

Arnold and Hood won in the final 7–6(8–6), 6–7(3–7), 6–3 against František Čermák and Leoš Friedl.

Seeds
Champion seeds are indicated in bold text while text in italics indicates the round in which those seeds were eliminated.

 František Čermák /  Leoš Friedl (final)
 Lucas Arnold /  Mariano Hood (champions)
 Simon Aspelin /  Massimo Bertolini (first round)
 Devin Bowen /  Ashley Fisher (semifinals)

Draw

External links
 2003 Campionati Internazionali di Sicilia Doubles draw

Campionati Internazionali di Sicilia
2003 ATP Tour
Camp